Camille Jullian (15 March 1859 – 12 December 1933) was a French historian, philologist, archaeologist and historian of literature.

A Professor of ancient history and classics at the University of Bordeaux from 1891, Jullian was awarded a chair at the Collège de France in 1905, where he taught national antiquities until 1930. He was made Grand Officier de la Légion d'Honneur in 1926, and was elected to the Académie française in 1924.

Jullian is the author of a monumental Histoire de la Gaule, published in eight volumes between 1907 and 1928, which has influenced Celtic studies throughout the 20th century.

Biography
Camille Louis Jullian was born on 15 March 1859 in Marseille, the son of Camille Jullian, a merchant and banker, and Marie Rouvière. Jullian came from a Protestant family of farmers originally from Calvisson, Gard. He attended the lycée of Marseille between 1864 and 1877, then the École Normale Supérieure, where he earned an agrégation in history and geography in 1880. Jullian was a member of the École française de Rome between 1880 and 1882. He became Doctor in Literature in March 1884.
Jullian taught ancient history and classics at the University of Bordeaux between 1883 and 1905, becoming Professor in 1891, then was elected to the Collège de France in 1905, where he taught national antiquities until 1930. Jullian became a member of the Académie des Inscriptions et Belles-Lettres in 1908, was made Grand Officier de la Légion d'Honneur in 1926, and was elected to the Académie Française in 1924.Jullian was involved with the controversy over the archaeological findings at Glozel in France; he was among those who believed the artefacts recovered were forgeries.

He died on 12 December 1933 in the 6th arrondissement of Paris.

Personal life 
Jullian was a Protestant. He held liberal and patriotic views.

In April 1890, Jullian married Jeanne Azam, the daughter of Étienne Azam, Professor of Medicine, and Anne Rolland. They had a daughter named Suzanne. The latter married a man named Simounet, a war veteran who ended his life in poverty; their son, the author Philippe Jullian, took instead his grandfather's name.

Works

On Bordeaux and Gironde 
 Étude d'épigraphie bordelaise. Les Bordelais dans l'armée romaine. Notes concernant les inscriptions de Bordeaux extraites des papiers de M. de Lamontagne, 1884
 Les antiquités de Bordeaux (Revue archéologique), 1885
 Inscriptions romaines de Bordeaux, 1887-1890 [available online on the Cujas Library website: Vol. I, Vol. II]
 Ausone et Bordeaux. Études sur les derniers temps de la Gaule romaine, 1893 Read online 
 Histoire de Bordeaux depuis les origines jusqu'en 1895, 1895 Read online

Works on Gauls 
 De protectoribus et domesticis augustorum, 1883
 Histoire des institutions politiques de l'ancienne France, de Fustel de Coulanges (posthumous edition of his works), 1890
 Gallia, tableau sommaire de la Gaule sous la domination romaine, Hachette, 1892
 Fréjus romain, 1886
 Notes d'épigraphie, 1886
 Les transformations politiques de l'Italie sous les empereurs romains, 43 av JC-330 après J.-C., 1884
 Extraits des historiens du XIXe, publiés, annotés et précédés d'une introduction sur l'histoire de France, 1897
 Inscriptiones Galliae narbonensis Latinae (CIL XII), en collaboration, 1899
  
 La politique romaine en Provence (218-59 avant notre ère), 1901
 Recherches sur la religion gauloise, 1903
 Plaidoyer pour la préhistoire, 1907
 Les anciens dieux de l'Occident, 1913
 Les Paris des Romains. Les Arènes. Les Thermes, 1924
 Histoire de la Gaule, rééd. Hachette, Coll. Références, 1993, 1270 pages,
 Au seuil de notre histoire. Leçons faites au Collège de France, 1905–1930, 3 vol. 1930-1931

Patriotic works 
 Le Rhin gaulois : le Rhin français, 1915
 Pas de paix avec Hohenzollern. À un ami du front, 1918
 La guerre pour la patrie, 1919
 Aimons la France, conférences : 1914-1919, 1920
 De la Gaule à la France. Nos origines historiques, 1922

References

Bibliography

Further reading 
 Christian Goudineau, Le dossier Vercingétorix, co-ed Actes Sud/Errance, 2001
 Albert Grenier, Camille Jullian, un demi-siècle de science historique et de progrès français, Albin Michel, 1944
 Charles-Olivier Carbonnell, Histoire et historiens, une mutation idéologique des historiens français, 1865-1885, Institut d'études politiques de Toulouse, 1976.

External links 
 
 

1859 births
1933 deaths
Writers from Marseille
19th-century French historians
20th-century French historians
French philologists
French archaeologists
École Normale Supérieure alumni
Members of the Académie Française
Members of the Académie des Inscriptions et Belles-Lettres
Recipients of the Legion of Honour
French epigraphers
Celtic studies scholars